Petteri Nikkilä (born July 27, 1994) is a Finnish professional ice hockey player. He is currently playing for Linköpings hockey club

Nikkilä made his Liiga debut playing with HPK during the 2013–14 Liiga season.

References

External links

1994 births
Living people
HPK players
SaPKo players
Finnish ice hockey defencemen
People from Hämeenlinna
Sportspeople from Kanta-Häme